Amy Frazier was the defending champion, but lost in the first round to Li Na in an upset.

Zheng Jie won the title by defeating Gisela Dulko 6–2, 6–0 in the final.

Seeds

Draw

Finals

Top half

Bottom half

References

2005 WTA Tour
Singles